The  Bill 588, introduced by Patrick Bloche, was the first bill on same-sex marriage that was voted by the parliament in France. It follows the decision of the Constitutional Council to let the legislature decide on this issue. The Socialist Party took advantage of a legislative window to put the text to the agenda. On 14 June 2011, the National Assembly of France voted 293–222 against the bill.

Votes

References

External links
  Proposition de loi visant à ouvrir le mariage aux couples de même sexe
  Scrutin public sur l'ensemble de la proposition de loi visant à ouvrir le mariage aux couples de même sexe

Same-sex marriage in France
Same-sex union legislation